Salamandra is a genus of salamanders.

Salamandra may also refer to:
Salamandra (band), Czech speed metal band
Salamandra (album), 1986 album by Miguel Bosé
W.W.S.1 Salamandra, Polish glider
Salamandra Kharkiv, Ukrainian ice-hockey team
Salamander (1928 film), a 1928 Soviet-German film

See also